Idar may refer to:

People
 Idar Andersen (born 1999), Norwegian road racing cyclist
 Idar Kreutzer (born 1962), Norwegian businessperson
 Idar Kristiansen (1932–1985), Norwegian poet, novelist, short story writer and non-fiction writer
 Idar Lind (born 1954), Norwegian novelist, crime fiction writer, songwriter and playwright
 Idar Lysgård (born 1994), Norwegian football player
 Idar Mathiassen (born 1976), Norwegian football player
 Idar Norstrand (1915–1986), Norwegian civil servant and politician
 Idar D. Rimestad
 Idar Ulstein (1934–2012), Norwegian businessperson
 Idar of Circassia, Circassian ruler of the Caucasus
 Jovita Idar (1885–1946), American journalist and civil rights activist

Places
 Idar, Gujarat, India
 History of Idar
 Idar Forest, Germany
 Idar State, India
 Idar-Oberstein, Germany

Other
 Battles of Idar